This is a list of flag bearers who have represented Guatemala at the Olympics.

Flag bearers carry the national flag of their country at the opening ceremony of the Olympic Games.

See also
Guatemala at the Olympics

References

Guatemala at the Olympics
Guatemala
Olympic flagbearers
Olympic